Vatnsstígur 16-18 is a residential tower located in downtown Reykjavík, Iceland. It is a part of a larger project called "shadow district" (Icelandic: Skuggahverfi) under phase 2.

References 

Towers in Iceland